Pirsaat may refer to:
Pirsaat, Baku, Azerbaijan
Pirsaat, Hajigabul, Azerbaijan
Pirsaat, Nəvahı, Azerbaijan
Pirsaat (river), in Azerbaijan